Leumeah is a suburb of Sydney, in the state of New South Wales, Australia 52 kilometres south-west of the Sydney central business district, in the local government area of the City of Campbelltown. It is north of the suburb of Campbelltown and is part of the Macarthur region.

History
The name Leumeah recognises both early settler John Warby, who called his farm Leumeah, and the Tharawal people who originally inhabited the area. It means "Here I rest" and comes from the Tharawal language. Clans of the Tharawal roamed over a wide area from Botany Bay to the Shoalhaven River and inland to Campbelltown. They lived a nomadic hunter-gatherer lifestyle, eating local foods (bush tucker) such as kangaroo, fish, yams and berries. They made tools out of stones, bones and shells to help them build bark shelters, canoes and possum-skin clothing.

John Warby was a convict explorer transported to Sydney on the Pitt in February 1792. In 1802, he was given the job of protecting the cattle roaming free in the Cowpastures area, as the area south west of Sydney was then known. He befriended the Tharawals and learnt some of their language. In 1816, he was granted  at what is now Leumeah where he built his house, a barn and stables. The barn still stands as part of the Colonial Motor Inn.

In 1887, a railway station was built in the area. Originally, it was named Holly Lea after the property of a local politician but local opposition swiftly got the name changed to Leumeah. In 1926, a substantial amount of land was released as a sub-division although the Great Depression deferred substantial growth in the area until after World War II. Subdivision continued throughout the 1950s and 1960s and in 1969, the suburb was formally named Leumeah.

The first Campbelltown North Post Office opened on 16 September 1960 and was renamed Leumeah from 1961.

The streets of Leumeah are named after famous dams, lakes of NSW, explorers and pioneer farmers. Continuing the theme from the suburb's own naming, Campbelltown Stadium, home of Macarthur Football Club, was originally called Orana Park after an aboriginal word for "welcome".

Heritage listings 
Leumeah has a number of heritage-listed sites, including:
 Holly Lea Road: Holly Lea and Plough Inn

Commercial area
Leumeah Shopping Centre has an IGA supermarket, Australia Post and many local shops within walking distance of Leumeah Train Station, which is located on O'Sullivan Road. Wests Leagues Club is on Old Leumeah Road.
Local shops are also located on Parkhill Crescent.

Transport
Leumeah railway station is serviced by the Airport & South Line on the Sydney Trains network.

Schools
 Leumeah Public School
 Leumeah High School

Population
In the 2006 Australian Bureau of Statistics census, Leumeah had a population of 8,661 people which could almost be described as a microcosm of Australian society with most key statistics such as place of birth, average age and income similar to the national averages. The suburb was more religious than the country as a whole with greater numbers of Roman Catholics (29%), Anglicans (26%) and Muslims (4%) and fewer non-religious people (11%) than the national figures. There were a number of small groups of people from non-English speaking backgrounds including Arabic (3%), Filipino (1%), Hindi (1%), Samoan (1%) and Spanish (1%). Most families were couples with children (46%) although there was a slightly higher than average number of single families (22%).

Sport
Campbelltown Stadium (formerly known as Orana Park & before that Alfred Duguid Oval) in Leumeah is the home ground of Macarthur Football Club.

References

External links

 Leumeah High School (Rarely updated)
 Leumeah Public School
 Campbelltown City Council

 
Suburbs of Sydney